The Journal of Advances in Information Fusion is a biannual peer-reviewed open access scientific journal covering information integration. It was established in 2006 and is the official journal of the International Society of Information Fusion. The journal is abstracted and indexed in Scopus and in Ei Compendex.

Editors 
The following persons are or have been editors-in-chief:
 William Dale Blair (2006–2013)
 Uwe D. Hanebeck (2014–present)

References

External links 

Computer science journals
English-language journals
Biannual journals
Open access journals
Academic journals published by learned and professional societies
Publications established in 2006